Chapter Two of the Constitution of South Africa contains the Bill of Rights, a human rights charter that protects the civil, political and socio-economic rights of all people in South Africa. The rights in the Bill apply to all law, including the common law, and bind all branches of the government, including the national executive, Parliament, the judiciary, provincial governments, and municipal councils. Some provisions, such as those prohibiting unfair discrimination, also apply to the actions of private persons.

South Africa's first bill of rights was drafted primarily by Kader Asmal and Albie Sachs in 1988 from Asmal's home in Dublin, Ireland. The text was eventually contained in Chapter 3 of the transitional Constitution of 1993, which was drawn up as part of the negotiations to end apartheid. This "interim Bill of Rights", which came into force on 27 April 1994 (the date of the first non-racial election), was largely limited to civil and political rights (negative rights). The current Bill of Rights, which replaced it on 4 February 1997 (the commencement date of the final Constitution), retained all of these rights and added a number of new positive economic, social and cultural rights

Application
The extent of the jurisdiction and application of the Bill of Rights (Southern Ndebele: ivikelamalungelo; ; ;) is defined by sections seven and eight, entitled "Rights" and "Application" respectively. Section seven provides that the rights apply to "all people in our country" (although certain rights are limited to citizens) and requires the state (by which is meant government at all levels) to "respect, protect, promote and fulfill" the Bill of Rights. It also notes that the rights in the Bill are subject to the limitations provided for in section thirty-six and elsewhere in the Bill; see Limitations below.

Although section two already provides for the supremacy of the Constitution over all laws and government actions, section eight explicitly states that the Bill of Rights applies to all laws and binds all branches and organs of government. It further states that the provisions of the Bill also bind private parties to the extent that they are applicable, given the nature of the rights in question, and requires the courts to develop the common law to this effect. Finally, section eight extends the benefits of the Bill of Rights to juristic persons, taking into account the nature of the rights and the juristic persons in question. Thus, for example, the right to human dignity and the right to health care clearly only apply to actual human beings, while the right to freedom of expression and the property right apply also to corporations.

Rights

Equality

Section 9 contains strong provisions on legal and social equality. Section 9 is in line with internationally recognised human rights law, but the provision is more detailed than for example in the Universal Declaration of Human Rights.

The Section starts with "Everyone is equal before the law and has the right to equal protection and benefit of the law. Equality includes the full and equal enjoyment of all rights and freedoms. To promote the achievement of equality, legislative and other measures designed to protect or advance persons, or categories of persons, disadvantaged by unfair discrimination may be taken."

The Section, like the Universal Declaration of Human Rights, prohibits all discrimination "on one or more grounds, including...", but specifically lists the following grounds "race, gender, sex, pregnancy, marital status, ethnic or social origin, colour, sexual orientation, age, disability, religion, conscience, belief, culture, language, and birth." This list is more extensive than the equality provisions in most human rights instruments, noteworthy is the distinction between "gender" and "sex", the inclusion of "pregnancy", the distinction between  "race" and "colour", and the inclusion of "age" and "disability".

Section 8 again not only indicates negative responsibilities, in that the State is not allowed to discriminate but also positive responsibilities in that it provides that "No person may unfairly discriminate directly or indirectly against anyone on one or more grounds in terms of subsection (3). National legislation must be enacted to prevent or prohibit unfair discrimination." See negative and positive rights.

Section 8 includes the limitation "Discrimination on one or more of the grounds listed in subsection (3) is unfair unless it is established that the discrimination is fair." This limitation allows for the South African government to enact the Black Economic Empowerment program, which seeks to redress the inequalities of Apartheid by giving previously disadvantaged groups (black Africans, Coloureds and Indians who are SA citizens) preference treatment in employment, tenders, etc.

Human dignity
Section 10 states "Everyone has inherent dignity and the right to have their dignity respected and protected".
The bill of rights is the basis on which constitutional matters form. It consists of several limitations including violating people's dignity in a form of body shaming, race, sex, cultural background, social background, and wealth.

Life

Section 11 states "Everyone has the right to life". In S v Makwanyane the Court found the right to life guaranteed by the Interim Constitution prohibited the death penalty. The court has subsequently ruled that capital punishment is also forbidden by the current constitution.

Freedom and security of the person
Section 12 protects "Freedom and Security of the Person". The Section sets out the rights contained under this provision, which include standard due process provisions, freedom from arbitrary arrest, freedom from torture, and freedom from cruel, inhuman, or degrading punishment. The Section also stipulates the freedom from all forms of violence, regardless of whether a public or private source. This provision is unique amongst human rights instruments.

The Section starts with "Everyone has the right to freedom and security of the person, which includes the right not to be deprived of freedom arbitrarily or without just cause; not to be detained without trial; to be free from all forms of violence from either public or private sources; not to be tortured in any way; and not to be treated or punished in a cruel, inhuman or degrading way".

The Section also covers reproductive rights, although not extensively defined. Adding to this the Section grants "security in and control over" the own body and to not be subjected to medical or scientific experiments without informed consent. These two provisions are unique amongst human rights instruments.

The Section reads "Everyone has the right to bodily and psychological integrity, which includes the right to make decisions concerning reproduction; to security in and control over their body; and not to be subjected to medical or scientific experiments without their informed consent.

Slavery, servitude and forced labour
Section 13 states "No one may be subjected to slavery, servitude or forced labour".

Privacy
Section 14 contains detailed provisions on the right to privacy. Defining the scope as follows: "Everyone has the right to privacy, which includes the right not to have the person or their home searched; their property searched; their possessions seized, or the privacy of their communications infringed".;

Freedom of religion, belief and opinion
Section 15 states "Everyone has the right to freedom of conscience, religion, thought, belief and opinion".

The Section expands on the Right to freedom of religion by stating “ Religious observances may be conducted at state or state-aided institutions, provided that those observances follow rules made by the appropriate public authorities; they are conducted on an equitable basis, and attendance at them is free and voluntary.

The Section also seeks to define how the right to freedom of religion, belief, and opinion is balanced against tradition and custom, by stating "This section does not prevent legislation recognizing marriages concluded under any tradition, or a system of religious, personal or family law; or systems of personal and family law under any tradition, or adhered to by persons professing a particular religion. “ The Section also provides that "Recognition in terms of paragraph (a) must be consistent with this section and the other provisions of the Constitution".

Freedom of expression
Section 16 contains detailed provisions concerning freedom of expression, stating "Everyone has the right to freedom of expression, which includes freedom of the press and other media; freedom to receive or impart information or ideas; 
freedom of artistic creativity; and academic freedom and freedom of scientific research".

Section 16 contains the following limitations to freedom of expression "The right in subsection (1) does not extend to propaganda for war; incitement of imminent violence; or advocacy of hatred that is based on race, ethnicity, gender or religion, and that constitutes incitement to cause harm..”

Assembly, demonstration, picket and petition
Section 17 states "Everyone has the right, peacefully and unarmed, to assemble, to demonstrate, to picket and to present petitions".
..

Freedom of association
Section 18 states "Everyone has the right to freedom of association".

Political rights
Section 19 sets out a detailed set of political rights, stating "Every citizen is free to make political choices, which includes the right to form a political party; to participate in the activities of, or recruit members for, a political party; and to campaign for a political party or cause.“

The Section also safeguards public participation by the means of election by stating "Every citizen has the right to free, fair and regular elections for any legislative body established in terms of the Constitution. Every adult citizen has the right to vote in elections for any legislative body established in terms of the Constitution, and to do so in secret; and to stand for public office and, if elected, to hold office". These provisions contain the implied limitation that only citizens of South Africa have a right to vote and that they must be "adults".

Citizenship
Section 20 states that "No citizen may be deprived of citizenship".

Freedom of movement and residence
Section 21 provides that "Everyone has the right to freedom of movement. Everyone has the right to leave the Republic". Hence these provisions apply to all humans, while the following are limited to South African citizens. "Every citizen has the right to enter, to remain in, and to reside anywhere in, the Republic. Every citizen has the right to a passport".

Freedom of trade, occupation and profession
Section 22 enshrines freedom of trade occupation and profession. This set of rights is unique among human rights instruments.

The Section states "Every citizen has the right to choose their trade, occupation or profession freely. The practice of a trade, occupation or profession may be regulated by law". It is important to note that this right is not unqualified. It may be restricted by the law if it is in the interests of the public in an open, fair, and democratic environment.

Labour relations
Section 23 sets out several labour rights, including the right to collective bargaining, and to join a trade union. The Section also stipulates the rights of the employer, as well as the rights of a trade union or employers' organisation, in great detail, which is unique amongst human rights instruments.

The Section states "Everyone has the right to fair labour practices. Every worker has the right to form and join a trade union; to participate in the activities and programmes of a trade union; and to strike".

With regard to employers, the Section states "Every employer has the right  
to form and join an employers' organisation; and to participate in the activities and programmes of an employers' organisation".

The Section lists the following rights for trade unions and employer organisations "Every trade union and every employers' organisation has the right to determine its own administration, programmes, and activities; to organise; and to form and join a federation. Every trade union, employers' organisation, and employer has the right to engage in collective bargaining".

The section concludes with the following limitation "National legislation may be enacted to regulate collective bargaining. To the extent that the legislation may limit a right in this Chapter, the limitation must comply with section 36(1). National legislation may recognize union security arrangements contained in collective agreements. To the extent that the legislation may limit a right in this Chapter, the limitation must comply with section 36(1).”

Environment
Section 24 sets out a number of environmental rights, which is unique in terms of human rights instruments, although environmental rights are recognized in the African Charter on Human and Peoples' Rights, although not in detail, and the Stockholm Declaration.

Article 24 specifically puts environmental rights into the context of human health, stating "Everyone has the right to an environment that is not harmful to their health or well-being;” As well as recognising the rights of future generations in the context of sustainable development by stating "and to have the environment protected, for the benefit of present and future generations, through reasonable legislative and other measures that prevent pollution and ecological degradation; promote conservation, and secure ecologically sustainable development and use of natural resources while promoting justifiable economic and social development".

Property
Section 25 enshrines the right to property, which is a standard international human right. The Section is very detailed, making it unique among human rights instruments. The Section amongst others covers arbitrary deprivation of property and compensation in great detail, which is in the context of the South African post-apartheid era and the Black Economic Empowerment program.

The Section states "No one may be deprived of property except in terms of law of general application, and no law may permit arbitrary deprivation of property. Property may be expropriated only in terms of law of general application for a public purpose or in the public interest; and subject to compensation, the amount of which and the time and manner of payment of which have either been agreed to by those affected or decided or approved by a court".

The Section makes detailed provisions on compensation by stating "The amount of the compensation and the time and manner of payment must be just and equitable, reflecting an equitable balance between the public interest and the interests of those affected, having regard to all relevant circumstances".

The Section sets out the context in which these provisions may be of relevance, stating "For the purposes of this section the public interest includes the nation's commitment to land reform, and to reforms to bring about equitable access to all South Africa's natural resources; and property is not limited to land. The state must take reasonable legislative and other measures, within its available resources, to foster conditions that enable citizens to gain access to land on an equitable basis. A person or community whose tenure of land is legally insecure as a result of past racially discriminatory laws or practices is entitled, to the extent provided by an Act of Parliament, either to tenure which is legally secure or to comparable redress. A person or community dispossessed of property after 19 June 1913 as a result of past racially discriminatory laws or practices is entitled, to the extent provided by an Act of Parliament, either to restitution of that property or to equitable redress".

Housing
Section 26 grants the right to housing, which is recognised by the African Commission on Human and Peoples' Rights. In the case SERAC v Nigeria (2001), the Commission concluded that the African Charter on Human and Peoples' Rights should be understood to include a right to housing and a right to food.
The Section states that "Everyone has the right to have access to adequate housing".

Section 26 places positive responsibilities upon the state in stating that "The state must take reasonable legislative and other measures, within its available resources, to achieve the progressive realisation of this right". The primary responsibility for fulfilling this mandate lies with the Department of Human Settlements.

Section 26 also grants the right to due process with regard to housing, stating that "No one may be evicted from their home, or have their home demolished, without an order of court made after considering all the relevant circumstances. No legislation may permit arbitrary evictions".

Health care, food, water, and social security

Section 27 sets out a number of rights with regard to health, including right to access to health care, including reproductive rights. Section 27 also enshrines the right to social security, the right to food, and the right to water. Section 27 states, "No one may be refused emergency medical treatment".

Again, positive responsibilities are placed on the state, the Section stating that "The state must take reasonable legislative and other measures, within its available resources, to achieve the progressive realisation of each of these rights.“

Children
Section 28 lists a number of rights held by children. These rights relate to domestic family life, child labour, education, imprisonment, and armed conflict. It is stated that "In this section, "child" means a person under the age of 18 years.“ and "A child's best interests are of paramount importance in every matter concerning the child.“

The rights listed are as follows
” to a name and a nationality from birth;”
” to family care or parental care, or to appropriate alternative care when removed from the family environment;”
” to basic nutrition, shelter, basic health care services, and social services;”
” to be protected from maltreatment, neglect, abuse or degradation;”
” to be protected from exploitative labour practices;”
” not to be required or permitted to perform work or provide services that are inappropriate for a person of that child's age; or place at risk the child's well-being, education, physical or mental health or spiritual, moral or social development;”
” not to be detained except as a measure of last resort, in which case, in addition to the rights a child enjoys under sections 12 and 35, the child may be detained only for the shortest appropriate period of time, and has the right to be kept separately from detained persons over the age of 18 years; and treated in a manner, and kept in conditions, that take account of the child's age;”
” to have a legal practitioner assigned to the child by the state, and at state expense, in civil proceedings affecting the child, if substantial injustice would otherwise result;”
” not to be used directly in armed conflict, and to be protected in times of armed conflict".

Education
Section 29 enshrines the right to education, and defines the positive responsibilities of the state in this respect. The Section states "Everyone has the right to a basic education, including adult basic education; and to further education, which the state, through reasonable measures, must make progressively available and accessible".

The right to education is amongst others recognised in the Universal Declaration of Human Rights, and Section 29 expands on this provision in detail with regard to language, and the right to the establishment of self-funded private schools.

The detailed provisions with regard to language reflect the fact that South Africa is a culturally diverse nation and has 11 official languages. Chapter 1 (Founding Provisions), Section 6 (Languages) of the Constitution of South Africa is the basis for the government language policy, and Section 29 (Chapter 2, Bill of Rights) places positive responsibilities upon the state in this regard.
Section 29 states that "Everyone has the right to receive education in the official language or languages of their choice in public educational institutions where that education is reasonably practicable. In order to ensure the effective access to, and implementation of, this right, the state must consider all reasonable educational alternatives, including single medium institutions, taking into account equity; practicability; and the need to redress the results of past racially discriminatory laws and practices".

See: Languages of South Africa

Language and culture
Section 30 also considers the issue of language in terms of cultural rights, although with limitation. Section 30 states that "Everyone has the right to use the language and to participate in the cultural life of their choice, but no one exercising these rights may do so in a manner inconsistent with any provision of the Bill of Rights".

See: Languages of South Africa

Cultural, religious and linguistic communities
Section 31 specifically considers cultural, religious, and linguistic communities within South Africa. Section 31 does not grant these communities group rights, but reaffirms their individual rights to exercise a number of cultural rights.

Section 31 states that "Persons belonging to a cultural, religious or linguistic community may not be denied the right, with other members of that community to enjoy their culture, practice their religion and use their language; and to form, join and maintain cultural, religious and linguistic associations and other organs of civil society".

Section 31 concludes with the following limitation "The rights in subsection (1) may not be exercised in a manner inconsistent with any provision of the Bill of Rights".

Access to information
Section 32 provides for the right to access to information, also known as the right to know. This provision is unique among human rights instruments but is comparable with freedom of information legislation in other countries. The right to know was enshrined in the South African Bill of Rights in reaction to the restrictive information policies of the Apartheid regime.

Section 32 states that "Everyone has the right of access to any information held by the state; and any information that is held by another person and that is required for the exercise or protection of any rights".

Section 32 not only provides for access to information held by the state but also from a third party if it is required to exercise or protect any right. This makes this provision unique, even among freedom of information legislation, which commonly only applies to public bodies. Section 32 applies to public bodies, as well as private bodies, including companies.

Procedures for access to information under section 32, and the limitations on the release of information, are regulated by the Promotion of Access to Information Act, 2000.

Just administrative action
Section 33 states that "Everyone has the right to administrative action that is lawful, reasonable and procedurally fair". This section is unique amongst human rights instruments in terms of its detail on administrative due process.

Access to courts
Section 34 effectively provides for the right to a fair trial. It states "Everyone has the right to have any dispute that can be resolved by the application of law decided in a fair public hearing before a court or, where appropriate, another independent and impartial tribunal or forum".

Arrested, detained and accused persons
Section 35 is a detailed list of rights, or right to due process. The Section lists rights with regard to arrest, court appearance, detention, and fair trial.

Limitations
Rights contained in the Bill of Rights are not absolute and may be limited by way of specific limitation clauses where individual rights are subject to limitations set out in the individual Sections, e.g. Section 9 on equality. In addition, the Constitution provides a General Limitation Clause at Section 36, which provides for all rights in the Bill of Rights to be limited in terms of law of general application and that "limitations must be reasonable and justifiable in an open and democratic society based on human dignity, equality, and freedom." Any limitation must therefore be reasonable and may only be made with good cause. Limits should also be less restrictive.

Organs of state, such as the judiciary, the legislature, or the executive, may invariably limit rights in carrying out their functions. For example, by limiting the freedom of a prisoner. Further, because of the horizontal application of the Bill of Rights, rights may be limited by the actions or decisions of other persons. The courts are empowered to test the validity of the limitation in terms of S36.

Section 36 provides certain factors that must be taken into account by the courts when determining if a limitation is reasonable and justifiable:
 The nature of the right. 
 The importance of the limitation
 The nature and extent of the limitation
 The relation between the limitation and its purpose, and
 Less restrictive means to achieve the purpose.
These factors are not absolute and other factors that the court may deem necessary may also be taken into account. When the nature of the right is considered, the courts will have to take into account the content of the right, the importance of the right and the interest which is protected. It is, for instance, very difficult to justifiably limit the right to life as the Constitutional Court held in S v Makwanyane where capital punishment was abolished. The promotion and protection of a permissible or lawful public interest will be important when considering the limitation and its purpose. Further, the Constitution requires a less restrictive means to be considered, rather than limiting the rights of an individual, in achieving that purpose.

Comparison with other human rights instruments
The limitations clause under section 36 has been compared to similar clauses in the European Convention on Human Rights. Specifically, there are limits on privacy rights (Section 8(2)), "except such as is in accordance with the law and is necessary in a democratic society", limits on freedom of thought and religion (art. 9(2)), "subject only to such limitations as are prescribed by law and are necessary for a democratic society," etc. In Canada, the Canadian Charter of Rights and Freedoms was adopted in 1982. Section 1 of that Charter, like section 36 of the South African law, states that rights are "subject only to such reasonable limits prescribed by law as can be demonstrably justified in a free and democratic society."

References

External links
 Bill of Rights – Government of South Africa

Constitution of South Africa
National human rights instruments
Human rights in South Africa